Ilsley is an unincorporated community and coal town located in Hopkins County, Kentucky, United States.

An act of incorporation for the town was passed in 1890. By 1902 the town had a post office. In the 1920s the community was home to mining operations with two pits each producing 500 tons a day of coal and a plant producing 650 tons of strip a day.

The Paducah & Louisville Railroad passed through the community until the tracks were removed in 2001. As of 2003 a trail was planned to replace the removed track.

In April 2020 a church in the community was at the centre of an outbreak of COVID-19 due to poor social distancing practises compounded by the claim that only influenza had been spreading at the church. A revival event at the Church on 14–15 March 2020 had led to 24 cases of COVID-19 and two deaths.

References

Unincorporated communities in Hopkins County, Kentucky
Unincorporated communities in Kentucky
Coal towns in Kentucky